Idalima is a genus of moths of the family Noctuidae. The genus was described by Turner in 1903.

Species
 Idalima aethrias Turner, 1908
 Idalima affinis Boisduval, 1832
 Idalima leonora Doubleday, 1846
 Idalima metasticta Hampson, 1910
 Idalima tasso Jordan, 1912

References

Agaristinae